The Campbell Playhouse (1938–1940) is a live CBS radio drama series directed by and starring Orson Welles. Produced by Welles and John Houseman, it was a sponsored continuation of The Mercury Theatre on the Air. The series offered hour-long adaptations of classic plays and novels, as well as adaptations of popular motion pictures.

When Welles left at the end of the second season, The Campbell Playhouse changed format as a 30-minute weekly series that ran for one season (1940–41).

Production

As a direct result of the front-page headlines Orson Welles generated with his 1938 Halloween production "The War of the Worlds", Campbell's Soup signed on as sponsor. The Mercury Theatre on the Air made its last broadcast December 4, 1938, and The Campbell Playhouse began December 9, 1938.

The series made its debut with Welles's adaptation of Rebecca, with guest stars Margaret Sullavan and Mildred Natwick. The radio drama was the first adaptation of the 1938 novel by Daphne Du Maurier; the author was interviewed live from London at the conclusion of the broadcast.

Bernard Herrmann had time to compose a complete score for "Rebecca". "It was absolutely beautiful," said associate producer Paul Stewart, "and it was the first time to me that Benny was something more than a guy who could write bridges." Herrmann later used the main theme as the basis of his score for the film Jane Eyre.

Although the same creative staff stayed on, the show had a different flavor under sponsorship. This was partially due to a guest star policy which relegated the Mercury Players to supporting roles. There was a growing schism between Welles, still reaping the rewards of his Halloween eve notoriety, and Houseman, who became an employee rather than a partner. Houseman worked primarily as supervising editor on the radio shows.

Howard E. Koch remained on the writing staff through "The Glass Key" (March 10, 1939), when he left for Hollywood. He was succeeded by Howard Teichmann, who wrote for the show for two years.

After signing a film contract with RKO in August 1939, Welles began commuting from Hollywood to New York for the two Sunday broadcasts of The Campbell Playhouse. In November 1939, production of the show moved from New York to Los Angeles.

Screenwriter Herman J. Mankiewicz was put on the Mercury payroll and wrote five scripts for Campbell Playhouse shows broadcast between November 12, 1939, and March 17, 1940. Mankiewicz proved to be useful, particularly working with Houseman as editor. The episode "Mr. Deeds Goes to Town" includes an inside joke: the Viennese doctor asked to certify Deeds insane is named Dr. Herman Mankiewicz.

After an argument over finances December 16, 1939, John Houseman resigned from the Mercury Theatre and returned to New York. Two months later Welles hired him back to work with Mankiewicz on a new venture, Welles's first film project, Citizen Kane.

After 20 shows, Campbell began to exercise more creative control over The Campbell Playhouse, and had complete control over story selection. Diana Bourbon, an account executive from the Ward Wheelock agency, was appointed as liaison between Welles and Campbell. Bourbon acted as de facto producer, and she and Welles frequently clashed over story and casting. One notable dispute came after the broadcast of "Algiers", which employed a carefully crafted tapestry of sound to create the world of the Casbah. Challenged on why the background sounds were so loud, Welles responded, "Who told you it was the background?"

Amiable classics were chosen over many of Welles's story suggestions, including Of Human Hearts; the rights to many works, including Rogue Male, Wuthering Heights  and The Little Foxes, could not be obtained. As his contract with Campbell came to an end, Welles determined not to sign on for another season. "I'm sick of having the heart torn out of a script by radio censorship," he said. After the broadcast of March 31, 1940—a reprise of Jane Eyre, after Welles's suggestion of Alice Adams was not accepted—Welles and Campbell parted amicably.
The Campbell Playhouse returned to radio November 29, 1940, as a 30-minute weekly CBS series that was last broadcast June 13, 1941. The program was produced by Diana Bourbon. The series' focus shifted away from classic play and novel adaptations to lighter, more popular fare, still with casts drawn from the ranks of film actors.

Episodes

TV series

The Campbell Playhouse is also the title of an American anthology series and television drama that aired on NBC June 6, 1952May 28, 1954. Sponsored by the Campbell Soup Company, the series also aired under the title Campbell Soundstage. In June 1954 the title of the series was changed to Campbell Summer Soundstage, and filmed presentations (many previously aired on Ford Theatre) were featured until the show left the air in September 1954.

See also

 Academy Award Theater
 Author's Playhouse
 Cavalcade of America
 CBS Radio Workshop
 The Cresta Blanca Hollywood Players
 Curtain Time
 Ford Theatre
 General Electric Theater
 Lux Radio Theater
 The Mercury Theatre on the Air
 The MGM Theater of the Air
 Screen Director's Playhouse
 The Screen Guild Theater
 Suspense
 Stars over Hollywood (radio program)
 Theater Guild on the Air

References

External links
 
 The Campbell Playhouse: Script of A Christmas Carol (December 24, 1939) (full text)
 Mercury Theatre site with Campbell Playhouse shows
 
 The Definitive: Guide to The Campbell Playhouse
 Frank M. Passage's Campbell Playhouse log
Zoot Radio, free old time radio show downloads of The Campbell Playhouse

1938 radio programme debuts
1940 radio programme endings
1930s American radio programs
1940s American radio programs
American radio dramas
Campbell Soup Company
CBS Radio programs
Works by Orson Welles
Anthology radio series